The West Indies cricket team toured Sri Lanka in November and December 2021 to play two Test matches. Originally scheduled to be played in October and November 2022, the tour was brought forward to be played after the 2021 ICC Men's T20 World Cup. The Test matches formed part of the 2021–2023 ICC World Test Championship. Ahead of the Test matches, the West Indies were scheduled to play a four-day warm-up game in Colombo. However, the match was abandoned without a ball being bowled due to rain.

In the first Test, the West Indies were set a target of 348 runs to win the match, but were reduced to 52 for 6 at the end of day four. Despite batting past the lunch break on the fifth day of the Test, the West Indies were bowled out for 160 runs, with Sri Lanka winning the match by 187 runs. Shortly after the fall of the last wicket, heavy rain fell at the ground. In the second Test, the West Indies were 65/2 at lunch on the final day, needing 232 more runs to win. However, they lost their last eight wickets for 40 runs, to be bowled out for 130. Sri Lanka won the match by 164 runs, winning the series 2–0.

Squads

Ahead of the second Test, Dushmantha Chameera, Asitha Fernando, Suminda Lakshan, Kamil Mishara and Roshen Silva were all released from the squad by the Sri Lankan selectors.

Tour match

Test series

1st Test

2nd Test

Statistics

Most runs

Most wickets

Zimbabwean cricket team in Sri Lanka in 2021–22

References

External links
 Series home at ESPN Cricinfo

2021 in Sri Lankan cricket
2021 in West Indian cricket
International cricket competitions in 2021–22
West Indian cricket tours of Sri Lanka